Crawford Mims (March 21, 1933 – April 21, 2001) was an American former college football player who was an All-American guard for the Ole Miss Rebels football team of the University of Mississippi.  

Mims attended the University of Mississippi in Oxford, Mississippi starting in 1950, where he played coach Johnny Vaught's Ole Miss Rebels football team from 1951 to 1953.  During his three seasons as a Rebel, the team compiled an overall win-loss-tie record of 21–6–4.  As a junior lineman for the 8–0–2 Rebels in 1952, he played in the Sugar Bowl on January 1, 1953.  The 1952 rebels finished No. 7 in both the final AP Poll and Coaches Poll.

Mims was a first-team All-Southeastern Conference (SEC) selection in 1952 and 1953, and the recipient of the SEC's Jacobs Blocking Trophy in 1953.  He was recognized as a consensus first-team All-American following his 1953 senior season, when he was a first-team selection by the American Football Coaches Association (AFCA), the Associated Press (AP), the Football Writers Association of America (FWAA), Newspaper Enterprise Association (NEA), The Sporting News, United Press International (UPI), the Walter Camp Football Foundation, and Look magazine.

Mims was inducted into the Ole Miss Sports Hall of Fame in 1988, and the Mississippi Sports Hall of Fame in 1995.

See also 

 List of Southeastern Conference football individual awards
 List of University of Mississippi alumni
 Ole Miss Rebels

References 

1933 births
2001 deaths
All-American college football players
American football guards
Ole Miss Rebels football players
People from Carrollton, Mississippi